Jos Kuipers (born 10 December 1961) is a Dutch retired basketball player. Born in Hoensbroek, he played two seasons in the United States with Fresno State and sixteen seasons with EBBC Den Bosch. Kuipers also played for the Netherlands national team and represented the team at four EuroBasket tournaments.

Early career
Kuipers started playing basketball with his local club Nepomuk in Hoensbroek. In 1984, he signed with EBBC Den Bosch.

Kuipers left to play college basketball for two seasons with the Fresno State Bulldogs.

National team career
Kuipers played 86 games for the Netherlands national basketball team and played at the EuroBasket tournaments of 1983, 1985, 1987 and 1989.

Awards and accomplishments
Den Bosch
7× Dutch Basketball League: (1983, 1984, 1987, 1988, 1993, 1996, 1997)
NBB Cup: (1993)

References

External links

1961 births
Centers (basketball)
Power forwards (basketball)
Fresno State Bulldogs men's basketball players
Dutch men's basketball players
Heroes Den Bosch players
Living people